Tillie is a 1922 American silent drama film directed by Frank Urson and starring Mary Miles Minter. The scenario was written by Alice Eyton, based on the novel Tillie, the Mennonite Maid by Helen Reimensnyder Martin. Tillie reunited Minter with Allan Forrest, her most frequent leading man from her time at Mutual Film and the American Film Company, for the first time since their 1919 picture Yvonne from Paris. As with many of Minter's features, Tillie is thought to be a lost film.

Plot

As described in various film magazine reviews, Tillie Getz (Minter) is a girl living in a community of Mennonites with her harsh father Jacob Getz (Beery), who treats her little better than a slave. Tillie longs for education and for an escape from the drudgery of her life, but only the kindly Doc Weaver (Littlefield) understands her ambitions.

Unbeknownst to Tillie, an elderly relative has willed her a small fortune, but only if she should enter into the Mennonite church by the time she has turned eighteen. Her father pressures her into joining the church, but Tillie resists, just as she resists the efforts of a local lawyer (Cooper) to push her into marriage with the undesirable Absalom (Anderson). The lawyer and Absalom are both aware of the terms of the will, and plot to share Tillie's fortune between them once they have convinced her to wed.

One day, Jack Fairchild (Forrest) comes to the town and finding himself captivated by Tillie, he takes up the position of the local schoolmaster so that he can remain close to her. In this way, the ambitions of Tillie's father, the lawyer and Absalom are all thwarted, and Tillie finds love with Jack and freedom from the Mennonite way of life.

Cast
Mary Miles Minter as Tillie Getz
Noah Beery, Sr. as Jacob Getz
Allan Forrest as Jack Fairchild
Lucien Littlefield as Doc Weaver
Lillian Leighton as Sarah Oberholtzzer
Marie Trebaol as Sallie Getz
Virginia Adair as Louisa
Robert Anderson as Absalom Puntz
Edward Cooper as Lawyer

References

External links

1922 films
1920s English-language films
Silent American drama films
1922 drama films
Paramount Pictures films
American black-and-white films
American silent feature films
Films directed by Frank Urson
Mennonitism in films
1920s American films